Sunstroke, or heat stroke, is a spectrum of disorders due to environmental heat exposure.

Sunstroke may also refer to:

 Sunstroke (1953 film), a Danish film directed by Astrid Henning-Jensen and Bjarne Henning-Jensen
 Sunstroke (1992 movie), a television film with Don Ameche
 Sunstroke (2014 film), a Russian film directed by Nikita Mikhalkov
 "Sunstroke" (song), by Chicane, 1997
 Sunstroke, a member of the Marvel comics supervillain team Masters of Evil

See also
 SunStroke Project, a musical group that represented Moldova in the Eurovision Song Contest 2010 and 2017.
 Heatstroke (disambiguation)